Justin Eugené Teeuwen (born 26 December 1995) is a Dutch male badminton player.

Achievements

BWF International Challenge/Series
Men's singles

 BWF International Challenge tournament
 BWF International Series tournament
 BWF Future Series tournament

References

External links
 

1995 births
Living people
Dutch male badminton players